Kuppam is a town in Chittoor district of the Indian state of Andhra Pradesh. It is the headquarters of Kuppam mandal in the Kuppam Revenue Division. The name "Kuppam" means a meeting place or confluence.

Demographics 
 census of India, Kuppam had a population of 21,963. The total population constitute, 11,091 males and 10,872 females - a sex ratio of 980 females per 1000 males. 2,551 children are in the age group of 0–6 years, of which 1,340 are boys and 1,211 are girls. The average literacy rate stands at 83.62% with 16,232 literates, significantly higher than the state average of 67.41%.

Climate 
Kuppam's climate is classified as tropical. When compared with winter, the summers have much more rainfall. This location is classified as Aw by Köppen and Geiger. The average annual temperature is 22.3 °C in Kuppam. The rainfall here averages 680 mm. Precipitation is the lowest in February, with an average of 2 mm. In October, the precipitation reaches its peak, with an average of 151 mm. At an average temperature of 28.0 °C, May is the hottest month of the year. At 18.0 °C on average, December is the coldest month of the year.

Languages 
Telugu is the official and most widely spoken language of the place. Tamil also widely spoken among the natives of this area. People can understand or speak Tamil and Kannada as it is located near to the neighboring states of Tamil Nadu and Karnataka.

Civic Administration 
Municipal Administration and Urban Development of Government of Andhra Pradesh is responsible for planning and execution of programs and civic administration of the town. Kuppam Municipality has 25 Wards.

Administrators:-

M.L.A :- Nara Chandrababu Naidu

M.L.C :- K.R.J Bharath 

Municipal Commissioner :- T. Ravi Reddy

Municipal Chairman :- Dr. Sudheer Darbha

Industry

Kuppam is known for its granite quarries and factories. A granite variety, Kuppam Green, is named after the town as this variety is abundantly found in this area and exported to foreign countries on demand.

Kuppam has the presence of hydro Extrusion India Pvt Ltd. Hydro is a major aluminium extrusions company headquartered in Oslo, Norway. This has now been acquired by Hindalco Industries Ltd.

Transport

Kuppam is well connected by both Roadways (NH42) and Railways. Bus services are provided by state corporations APSRTC (Andhra Pradesh),
TNSTC (Tamil Nadu) And Karnataka State Transport Corporation (KSRTC).

Chennai Central to K.S.R Bengaluru railway line passes through Kuppam (KPN) and is the only railway station in the route belonging to Andhra Pradesh. Kuppam Railway Station comes under Bangalore Division, South Western Railways (SWR).

As Kuppam Railway Station (KPN) is located exactly at the middle of Bangarapet railway junction and Jolarpettai railway junction, it is well connected to Chennai, Vijawada, Coimbatore, Tirupati, Mysuru, Mumbai, Patna and Bengaluru via train. An exclusive train service is provided for working people between Kuppam and K.S.R Bengaluru that runs from Monday to Saturday. There is upcoming Kuppam Airport. Its very well connected.

Politics

Kuppam is an assembly constituency (comprising Kuppam, Gudipalle, Shantipuram, Ramakuppam mandals) in the Indian state of Andhra Pradesh. There are 1,61,872 registered voters in Kuppam constituency as of 1999. N. Chandrababu Naidu (former Chief Minister of Andhra Pradesh) is the current Member of Legislative Assembly (MLA) of Kuppam.

Education

Schools

Primary and secondary education in Kuppam is offered by various schools which are affiliated to one of the boards of education, such as the Secondary School Leaving Certificate (SSLC), Indian Certificate of Secondary Education (ICSE), Central Board for Secondary Education (CBSE). Schools in Kuppam are either government run or are private (both aided and un-aided by the government).

Medical College 

P.E.S. Institute of Medical Sciences and Research was established in 2001 and offers Diploma, Under Graduation and Post Graduation courses in the field of Medicine.

University

Dravidian University was established in 1997 and offers different Under Graduation, Post Graduation and Research programs.

Engineering and Technology

Kuppam Engineering College was established in 2001 and offers different Under Graduation, Post Graduation and Research programs related to Engineering, Business Administration and Technology.

Agastya International Foundation

It has a "Campus Creativity Lab" located on a 172-acre campus in Kuppam, which houses science and art centers that includes an astronomy center and planetarium, center for creative teaching, an innovation hub, a science model-making center, the Ramanujan Math Park, an open-air ecology lab and many more. The campus receives over 650 children every day and also trains teachers from seven states in India.

Culture 

"Sri Tirupati Gangamma Jathara Kuppam" is one of the most important and oldest festivals of Kuppam dedicated to the Hindu Goddess Gangamma Devi. It is celebrated annually, over a period of nine days in the month of May. The history of the festival dates back to over a couple of centuries. Local legend has it that Lord Venkateswara was upset with his sister Gangamma for devouring corpses at the burial ground. In order to stop his sister from doing so, the Lord chopped off Gangamma's cheek, which is believed to have fallen in 

Kuppam and surrounding areas like Tirupati, Chittoor, Punganur, Vaniyambadi and Gudiyattam. To mark this event, the annual jatara is celebrated in Kuppam.
"Peddapuli Gangamma Jatara" is one of the important and the oldest festivals of Kuppam dedicated to the Hindu Goddess Peddapuli Gangamma Devi. "Aadi Krithika" is one of the important and the oldest festivals of Kuppam dedicated to the Tamil Hindu God Subrahmanyaswamy in the month of July or August (Aadi month - Tamil calendar). Other popular festivals in Kuppam are Ugadi, Ram Navami, Eid ul-Fitr, Ganesh Chaturthi, Deepawali and Christmas.

Notable people from Kuppam 
Notable people from Kuppam include:
 Nara Chandrababu Naidu
 V. Nagayya
 Adyar K. Lakshman
 B. R. Panthulu

See also 
List of census towns in Andhra Pradesh

References

External links 

Census towns in Andhra Pradesh
Mandal headquarters in Chittoor district